Enrico Poitschke (born 23 August 1969 in Görlitz) is a German former  road racing cyclist.

Major results

2001
 1st, Stage 3, Ringerike GP
 1st, Stage 5, Ringerike GP
 1st, General Classification, Ringerike GP
 1st, Stage 4, Course de la Paix
 1st, Criterium München
 1st, Criterium Hof
2003
 1st, Rund um Hainleite-Erfurt

External links
 

1969 births
Living people
German male cyclists
People from Görlitz
Cyclists from Saxony
People from Bezirk Dresden
East German male cyclists